Omo or OMO may refer to:

Geography

Ethiopia
 Omo River (Ethiopia), in southern Ethiopia is the largest Ethiopian river outside the Nile Basin and namesake for all the topics below
 Omo Nada, one of the woredas in the Oromia Region of Ethiopia
 South Omo Zone, a zone in the Ethiopian Southern Nations, Nationalities and Peoples' Region (SNNPR)
 Omo National Park, Ethiopia 
 Omo Kibish Formation, an East African rock formation
 Omo remains, a collection of hominid bones

Elsewhere
Omo River(Yamanashi)
Omø, an island in Denmark
Omo River (Quebec), a tributary of Maicasagi River in Quebec, Canada

People
 Omo Osaghae (born 1988), American hurdler
 Suleiman Omo (born 1985), Nigerian footballer for clubs in southeastern Europe

Acronyms and codes 
 Open market operation, by the Federal Reserve or other central banks
 Open Market Option allows someone approaching retirement to ‘shop around’
 One-man operation (OMO), a bus or tram on which the driver collects the fares
 Oracle Media Objects a software development application.
 Ontario Mathematics Olympiad
 Mostar Airport, Bosnia and Herzegovina, IATA code OMO

Other uses
 Omo (detergent), a detergent product
 Omo sebua, a traditional house style of the Nias people of Indonesia
 Omo tuo, a Ghanaian staple food made with rice
 Omo-, a prefix for the scapula
 Omorashi, bladder incontinence fetishism

See also
 
 
 Ommo (disambiguation)
 Omon (disambiguation)
 Omos, professional wrestler (WWE)
 Omos, fictional star and solar system introduced in Edgar Rice Burroughs' Adventure on Poloda 1942